WWF SmackDown! It is the third game in the WWF SmackDown! series, based on the World Wrestling Federation (WWF) professional wrestling promotion, the sequel to WWF SmackDown! 2: Know Your Role, the first game in the series to be released on the PlayStation 2 console, and the last game in the series to be released under the "WWF" name. 

The game was succeeded the following year by WWE SmackDown! Shut Your Mouth, which was released in October 2002.

Gameplay

This was the first game in the SmackDown! series to feature play-by-play commentary, with Michael Cole and Tazz featured as the announcers. One improvement in this game is the appearance of six-man tag team matches, as well as six-man and eight-man battle royals. This would be the only game in the series in which players were allowed to have eight players on the screen at once until the release of WWE 2K18. Additionally, this was the first game of the series to give each wrestler two different finishing moves, as well as the first game to allow editing of the in-game wrestlers' move sets. Just Bring It was also the first game in the series to feature authentic, complete ring entrances. The game features several venues from 2000 and 2001, including the arena for Raw Is War and both the original and new arenas for SmackDown! (Ovaltron, including the Sunday Night Heat version, and the Fist stages). However, all pay-per-view arenas (except for WrestleMania X-Seven and Insurrextion) utilize the same arena with different logos on the ring mat, with the arena being based on the design of WrestleMania 2000.

The game's roster was criticised at the time for being heavily outdated, as it was finalized very early in WWF's Invasion angle and prior to the emergence of several former ECW and WCW wrestlers. Whilst William Regal, Raven, Rhyno, Tajiri, Spike Dudley, Jerry Lynn and Molly Holly were all new additions to the game, several stars who had become more prominent on WWF television, such as Rob Van Dam, Booker T, Diamond Dallas Page, The Hurricane, Lance Storm and Mike Awesome were not included, which was also reflected by the inclusion of Fully Loaded 2000 as one of the featured pay-per-view mats instead of Invasion. In addition to these, Limp Bizkit vocalist Fred Durst appears in the game as an agreement with the WWF and THQ which allowed their song "Rollin' (Air Raid Vehicle)" to be included as The Undertaker's then-theme music (it is one of his only two game appearances, as he also appears in WWF Raw for the Xbox). This is also the only WWF game in which Jerry Lynn appears, as he would be gone from the company within five months of its release.

A new gameplay addition is the reversal system. Just Bring It utilizes a counter-attack mechanic system that allows almost every move to be countered, as well as allowing some counter-attacks (such as punches) to be re-countered.

Game modes
Rather than the Season Modes presented in the previous SmackDown! games, Just Bring It instead has a Story Mode. The player is given more control over their wrestler's activities, such as having the ability to choose which WWF title to go after. Throughout Story Mode, the player is able to attain unlockables, including additional superstars, arenas, and match types.

Release
The game ended up selling more than 400,000 units in North America, for which it was added to the Sony Greatest Hits collection for the PlayStation 2 on October 17, 2002, and became THQ's second Greatest Hits game, only bested by Red Faction. However, when the game was re-released, it was renamed to WWE SmackDown! Just Bring It because of the World Wrestling Federation's recently lost court battle with the World Wildlife Fund, following which the World Wrestling Federation was renamed to the World Wrestling Entertainment (WWE), although in-game branding was not changed.

Reception

The game received "generally favorable reviews" according to video game review aggregator Metacritic. However, the game's in-game commentary has been criticized for being disjointed and repetitive, with noticeable pauses when calling wrestler or move names. Gary Whitta of Next Generation said, "Marred by some serious flaws and a jarring lack of atmosphere, Just Bring It still delivers a few rasslin' thrills." In Japan, Famitsu gave it a score of 29 out of 40.

It received a "Platinum" sales award from the Entertainment and Leisure Software Publishers Association (ELSPA), indicating sales of at least 300,000 copies in the United Kingdom.

See also

List of licensed wrestling video games
List of fighting games
List of video games in the WWE 2K Games series

References

External links

2001 video games
Multiplayer and single-player video games
PlayStation 2 games
PlayStation 2-only games
Professional wrestling games
THQ games
Video games developed in Japan
WWE SmackDown! 03
WWE video games
Yuke's games